Vincent "Sweet Pea" Burns (born June 21, 1981 in Valdosta, Georgia)  Burns played college football at Northern Arizona University and the University of Kentucky, and was drafted by the Indianapolis Colts in the 3rd round of the 2005 NFL Draft.  Burns never lived up to his draft position and never played in a regular season game.

External links
Vincent Burns at ESPN.com

1981 births
Living people
People from Valdosta, Georgia
Players of American football from Georgia (U.S. state)
American football defensive ends
Northern Arizona Lumberjacks football players
Kentucky Wildcats football players
Indianapolis Colts players